Sveneld (Old Norse: Sveinaldr, Cyrillic: Свенельд) is a semi-legendary 10th-century Varangian warlord in the service of Sviatoslav I and his family. Although he seems to have been the richest and the most influential Rus' leader after the ruling prince, his relation to the House of Rurik, if it existed, has not been positively established. Most of information about Sveneld is scarce.

Sveneld started his military career under (or perhaps independently of) Igor of Kiev, when he put to the sword the tribe of Ulichs and secured for himself the right to exact tribute from them and from the Drevlians. The historian Lev Gumilev suggests that Sveneld's enormous fortune, recorded in the Primary Chronicle in 945, was acquired during the 944 expedition of the Rus' against the city of Berdaa in Caucasian Albania, now Azerbaijan, in which Sveneld is presumed to have been the commander-in-chief.

Igor's druzhina became jealous of Sveneld's wealth and attempted to levy tribute in his lands, but the Drevlyans revolted and killed Igor. Aleksey Shakhmatov theorizes that the Drevlyan uprising against Igor was led by Sveneld's son Mstisha. This theory is not universally agreed upon, though.

Igor's successor Svyatoslav seemed to have been on better terms with Sveneld, who was the second in command during his campaigns in Bulgaria and Byzantium. In 971, he was in charge of the defense of Preslav against the Greeks. Although the Byzantine historians John Skylitzes and Leo the Deacon testify that Sphangel (as he was known to them) met his death at Dorostolon the same year, the Slavonic chronicles mention Sveneld's activities several times thereafter.

It has even been suggested that Sveneld's own tales found reflection in the chronicle's account of Svyatoslav's campaigns. For example, not entirely impartial is a passage about Sveneld's attempts to warn Svyatoslav to avoid the Dnieper cataracts on his way back to Kiev. According to the chronicle, Svyatoslav slighted Sveneld's wise advice and was ambushed and killed by the Pechenegs, while the old general successfully returned to Kiev by land.

Sveneld seems to have held much of the true power during the minority of Svyatoslav's son Yaropolk. The chronicle blames him for having fomented a fratricidal war between Yaropolk and his brother Oleg of the Drevlyans. Indeed, Sveneld may have coveted Oleg's Drevlyan lands as his own ancient possession. In later centuries it was said that the war was sparked by Oleg's order to kill Sveneld's son Lyut (Ljótr) when he hunted in the Drevlyan lands which Oleg regarded as his own.

After the death of Lyut Sveneld is not mentioned further in the chronicles. Instead, it is Blud who acts as his successor in command of Yaropolk's army, to become the ultimate traitor of this prince. Most historians conclude naturally that Sveneld who was certainly very old by the end of 970s should have died before the war between Yaropolk and Vladimir I of Kiev.

Popular culture

Sveneld is major supporting character in the Soviet historical film The Legend of Princess Olga, played by Ukrainian actor Konstantin Stepankov. Sveneld also appears in the 2016 film Viking as an antagonistic character, played by veteran Russian theatrical actor Maksim Sukhanov.

See also
List of Ukrainian rulers

Notes

Kievan Rus' people
Viking warriors
Russian military leaders
Ukrainian military leaders
Varangians
920s births
970s deaths
10th-century Rus' people